Michel Béroff (born 9 May 1950) is a French pianist and conductor of Bulgarian origin.

Background and education

Béroff was born at Épinal, and trained at the Nancy Conservatory, winning the 1st prize in 1962 and the prize of excellence in 1963. He completed his studies at the Paris Conservatory with Yvonne Loriod, winning the 1st prize in 1966.

Career 
In 1967 he made his Paris debut and won 1st prize in the Messiaen competition in Royan. Thereafter he toured extensively internationally and performed with most of the major orchestras and as a recitalist. He completed acclaimed Southern Africa tours in 1972 and 1975.

He has recorded extensively for EMI in works by Liszt, Prokofiev, Stravinsky, J.S. Bach, Debussy, Bartók and Messiaen.

He has also turned to conducting.

Notable students
 Seong-Jin Cho

References

 Baker's Biographical Dictionary of 20th Century Classical Musicians, N. Slonimsky, Schirmer Books, 1997

1950 births
Living people
People from Épinal
20th-century French male classical pianists
French male conductors (music)
Conservatoire de Paris alumni
Academic staff of the Conservatoire de Paris
EMI Classics and Virgin Classics artists
21st-century French male classical pianists
20th-century French conductors (music)
21st-century French conductors (music)